Victor Joly (15 April 1923 – 10 June 2000) was a Belgian racing cyclist. He rode in the 1947 and the 1948 Tour de France.

References

External links

1923 births
2000 deaths
Belgian male cyclists
Cyclists from Hainaut (province)
People from Quévy
20th-century Belgian people